is a Japanese pop singer and songwriter. She is best known for her songs used for anime theme music, particularly the opening and ending themes of the Full Metal Panic! series. In addition to her vocal talents, Shimokawa can also play the piano. She is a former member of the girl group Checkicco.

Personal life 

Mikuni is currently married to voice actor Tsuyoshi Koyama. The two were wed on Valentine's Day 2012.

Discography

Albums

Studio albums

Compilation albums

Singles

References

External links 
 

Anime musicians
1980 births
Living people
Musicians from Hokkaido
Pony Canyon artists
21st-century Japanese singers
21st-century Japanese women singers